Noah Nicholas Reid (born May 29, 1987) is a Canadian actor and musician, best known for his work on the television series Franklin and Schitt's Creek. In 2016, he received a Canadian Screen Award nomination for Best Original Song for his work in the feature film People Hold On. In 2019, he received a Canadian Screen Award for Best Supporting Actor in a Comedy for his work on Schitt's Creek.

Early life
Reid was born and raised in Toronto, Ontario. The son of visual artists, he became involved in theatre around age six and regularly attended productions with his family throughout his childhood. He attended Etobicoke School of the Arts and is a 2008 graduate of the National Theatre School of Canada.

Career
Starting as a child actor, Reid did extensive voice work for Canadian and American children's television and was the original voice of the title character in Franklin from 1997 to 2004. While at Etobicoke School of the Arts, he co-starred in Strange Days at Blake Holsey High (2002–2006). 

In 2005, Reid played Darrell Fox in the made-for-television movie Terry, dramatizing Terry Fox's historic run for cancer research. In 2007, he appeared in the Naturally, Sadie episode "As the Whirly Turns". In 2009, he guest-starred in the Degrassi: The Next Generation episode "Danger Zone".

Reid's first leading role in a feature film was Farley Gordon in Score: A Hockey Musical, which premiered at the 2010 Toronto International Film Festival. He then played several guest roles on television, including in the police drama Rookie Blue (2012, the project on which he met future wife Clare Stone) and the drama series Cracked (2013). In 2013, he also starred in the CW web series Backpackers. In 2015, Reid appeared briefly in the first episode of Annie Murphy's CBC television series The Plateaus. That year, he played the lead role in the ABC Family comedy series Kevin From Work, which was canceled after one season.

In 2016, Reid was nominated for a Canadian Screen Award for Best Original Song for his work in the feature film People Hold On (2015), in which he also starred. He also released a self-produced full-length original album, Songs From a Broken Chair.

In 2017, Reid played the recurring role of Patrick in the third season of the CBC series Schitt's Creek. That year, he was also cast in the independent film Cardinals opposite Sheila McCarthy, which premiered at the 2017 Toronto International Film Festival.

In 2018, Reid was promoted to a series regular on Schitt's Creek, beginning with its fourth season. He also performed in a production of Hamlet at the Tarragon Theatre in Toronto. He appeared in the films Buffaloed and Disappearance at Clifton Hill, both released in February 2020. Also in February, Reid embarked on a sold-out tour across North America to support his then-upcoming second album. However, two-thirds of the original dates had to be indefinitely postponed due to the COVID-19 pandemic. The album, Gemini, was released on May 29, 2020; the album's cover alluded to Reid's dual status as a musician and actor by depicting a Gemini Award statuette.

Reid made his Broadway debut in April 2022, joining the original Broadway cast of Tracy Letts's The Minutes, and released his third album, Adjustments, in June 2022.

Personal life
Reid announced his engagement to former actress Clare Stone on December 31, 2018. They were married on July 25, 2020, and their first child, a son, was born in late summer 2022. Reid is a dual Canada-US citizen.

Discography

Albums

Singles

Theatre

Filmography

Awards and nominations

References

External links

Official website

1987 births
Living people
20th-century Canadian male actors
20th-century Canadian male musicians
21st-century Canadian male actors
21st-century Canadian male musicians
Canadian male child actors
Canadian male television actors
Canadian male voice actors
Canadian people of American descent
Canadian people of Bulgarian descent
Male actors from Toronto
Musicians from Toronto
National Theatre School of Canada alumni
Best Supporting Actor in a Comedy Series Canadian Screen Award winners